The Statue of the Sentinel of Freedom or the Lapu Lapu Monument is a monument to Lapulapu located at Rizal Park specifically at the center of the Agrifina Circle.

History

In 2004, House of Representatives members Raul del Mar and Nerissa Corazon Soon-Ruiz initiated the installation of a statue of Lapulapu in Rizal Park as a move to honor Lapulapu as a hero of not only Cebu but the whole Philippines. They urged the Office of the President to an accept their proposal. Then-tourism Secretary Richard Gordon, who was a candidate in the 2004 Senate elections, supported the installation of the statue. The project was opposed by the National Historical Institute (NHI) led by Ambeth Ocampo, which insist that only statues of heroes of the Philippine Revolution could be stand in the Agrifina Circle.

The statue was unveiled on February 5, 2004 despite opposition from the NHI, after then President Gloria Macapagal Arroyo greenlit the move. The Korean Freedom League led by Chairman Kwon Jung-dal donated  for the casting of the statue. The statue was momentarily dismantled from the Agrifina Circle sometime in mid-2004, which was met with opposition including the local government of Lapu-Lapu City at that time.

In 2014, Lapu-Lapu City Mayor Paz Radaza requested the transfer of the statue to Punta Engaño of her city where she plans to put it in an island to be made at the tip of the locality. This proposal came up after Radaza talked to Tourism Secretary Ramon Jimenez, Jr. where the National Historical Institute's (NHI) opinion that the statue could "desecrate" Rizal Park was brought up. The move was opposed by Raul del Mar who said that the move would be detrimental and will cause a “loss of  honor and recognition” to the province and Cebu and Lapu-Lapu.

Design and symbolism
The Statue of the Sentinel of Freedom and was designed by sculptor Juan Sajid Imao. The monument is composed of a  bronze statue on-top of a  pedestal. Imao noted that his work on the statue seeks to portray Lapulapu as a strong and peace-loving man who is also ready to defend himself against those who threaten his freedom. Lapulapu is portrayed not in a fighting stance but rather standing guard holding a kampilan covered in scabbard and planted on the ground.

Then Tourism Undersecretary Oscar Palabyab chose to create a statue for Lapulapu not primarily due to his victory over Ferdinand Magellan but the value he stands for in history.

According to Gordon, the Lapulapu represents the Muslims and Rizal represents the Tagalog-Christians in Philippine history.

The statue which was also donated by the Korean Freedom League was a gift in recognition for Filipinos who fought for South Korea in the Korean War.

See also 
 Lapu-Lapu Shrine

References 

Monuments and memorials in Metro Manila
Buildings and structures in Ermita
Sculptures by Filipino artists